F-22 Raptor is a combat flight simulation video game released by Novalogic in 1997.

Gameplay
The game involves modern air combat in several campaigns and missions. The campaigns are set around fictional wars in areas such as Angola, Jordan, Russia, Colombia, and Iran, with the player fighting for the United States.

Reception

The game received favorable reviews according to the review aggregation website GameRankings.

References

External links

1997 video games
Combat flight simulators
Video games developed in the United States
Windows games
Windows-only games
NovaLogic games